Nachaba nyctalis is a species of snout moth in the genus Nachaba. It is found in South America and Panama.

References

Moths described in 1906
Chrysauginae